William Sprague IV (September 12, 1830September 11, 1915) was the 27th Governor of Rhode Island from 1860 to 1863, and U.S. Senator from 1863 to 1875. He participated in the First Battle of Bull Run during the American Civil War while he was a sitting Governor.

Early years
Sprague was born in the Gov. William Sprague Mansion in Cranston, Rhode Island, the youngest son of Amasa and Fanny Morgan Sprague. His uncle and namesake William Sprague III was also a Governor and U.S. Senator as well as U.S. Representative from Rhode Island. Sprague's family spent considerable time in Thorsby, Alabama, but eventually returned so the children could attend Irving Institute. William and brother Amasa's education at the Irving Institute in Tarrytown, New York, was cut short when their father was murdered on New Year's Eve in 1843. The murder was considered a major event of the period, and the trial of accused killer John Gordon was marked by anti-Irish bigotry; Gordon was subsequently found guilty and executed.

Both brothers were called to work in the family business, the A.& W. Sprague Manufacturing Company, which was then under the direction of their uncle William III. When their uncle died in 1856, William and Amasa – along with their cousin Col. Byron Sprague, son of William III, and their mother Fanny Sprague and Aunt Harriet, widow of William III – became partners in the company. The second incorporation of the A. & W. Sprague Company occurred on June 2, 1859.  It soon was the largest calico printing textile mill in the world.  The company ran five weaving mills in New England.  The Hartford, Providence and Fishkill Railroad – of which William III had purchased controlling interest – connected the five mills to the Sprague Print Works in Cranston. The woven cloth was brought to Cranston to be printed. Sprague later became interested in linen weaving and locomotive building.

At age 18, Sprague joined the Providence Marine Corps of Artillery, a unit of the Rhode Island Militia. He enlisted as a private, but soon received his commission as a second lieutenant. Within three years Sprague had been promoted through the ranks to command the unit as a colonel. As the commander, Sprague personally funded all of its expenses, including uniforms, equipment, small arms, and a full battery of light artillery.

Politics and the Civil War
Like his uncle, William Sprague IV had an interest in politics and was elected in 1860 as the Rhode Island Union Party candidate for Governor over the Republican Party whose candidate was seen as too radical. He was re-elected in 1861 and 1862. At twenty-nine years old, he was the youngest governor of a state at that time. He was sometimes referred to as the "boy governor," a title he may have given himself while campaigning for election.

As the Civil War approached, Sprague promised U.S. President Abraham Lincoln the support of Rhode Island. Upon Lincoln's call for volunteers in April 1861, a brigade of two infantry regiments was raised by Rhode Island.  Sprague, believing that the war would last only 48 hours, accompanied the Rhode Island brigade, under command of Colonel Ambrose Burnside, in the First Battle of Bull Run on July 21, 1861.  During the battle, while Sprague acted as an aide to General Burnside, his horse was shot from under him.  The Confederate victory made it clear to Sprague that the war would last longer than two days.  Although he was offered a commission as a brigadier general of Volunteers on August 9, 1861 (with a date of rank of May 17, 1861), he declined the appointment to focus on his duties as governor.

In 1862, Sprague attended the Loyal War Governors' Conference in Altoona, Pennsylvania, which ultimately backed Abraham Lincoln's Emancipation Proclamation and the Union war effort.  Retiring from the governor's office in 1863, he was elected by the state Senate to two six-year terms as US Senator from Rhode Island, taking office on March 4, 1863, and serving until March 3, 1875. He served as chairman of the committees on public lands and on manufactures and as a member of the committees on commerce and on military affairs.

Innovations and ideas
After leaving the Senate, he resumed the direction of his manufacturing establishments. He operated the first rotary machine for making horseshoes, perfected a mowing machine, and also various processes in calico printing, especially that of direct printing on a large scale with the extract of madder without a chemical bath. Sprague claimed to have discovered what he called the "principle of the orbit as inherent in social forces." He asserted that money is endowed with two tendencies, the distributive and the aggregative.  When the aggregative tendency predominates, as before the Civil War, decadence results; but when the distributive tendency is in the ascendancy, as it was later in the 19th century, there is progress.

Personal life

On November 12, 1863, Sprague married Kate Chase, daughter of Salmon P. Chase, the former Governor of Ohio and Secretary of the Treasury.  She was considered the belle of Washington.  Sprague's wedding gift to Kate was a tiara of matched pearls and diamonds that cost $5700. As the bride entered the room, the Marine Band played "The Kate Chase March" which composer Thomas Mark Clark had written for the occasion.  Although their marriage began well, quarreling became more common. They had four children:

 William "Willie" Sprague V (1865–1890), who killed himself at age 25 in 1890.
 Ethel Chase Sprague (1869–1936), who married Dr. Frank Donaldson (1856–1906).
 Catherine "Kitty" Sprague (1872–1910), who was mentally disabled and lived with her mother.
 Portia Sprague (1873–1932), who married Frank Browning (1867–1932).

William's financial and political fortunes rapidly deteriorated in 1873, with the financial panic.  His holdings were extensive both in Rhode Island and nationally.  The death of his father-in-law, Salmon P. Chase, in the same year who had become Chief Justice of the United States, added to his family problems.  Severe setbacks occurred to the A. & W. Sprague Company following the Panic of 1873. Likewise, the Spragues' marriage unravelled as William began to drink more, had affairs with other women and began to criticize Kate's spending.  Kate allegedly had an affair with New York senator Roscoe Conkling. According to popular rumor, in 1879 Sprague chased Conkling off his Narragansett estate after catching him with Kate, thus ending the alleged affair.

The couple divorced in 1882. William stayed with his father and the daughters lived with Kate Chase, who took back her maiden name after the divorce.  After spending some time in Europe, Kate lived with her daughters outside Washington, D.C. at Edgewood, her father's estate. When her only son Willie Sprague killed himself at age 25 in 1890, Kate Chase became a recluse.  She died at her homestead, Edgewood, in poverty in 1899.

Canonchet

In 1850, Sprague purchased the William Robertson farm in Narragansett, which was known to have once been the location of the summer campsite of Narragansett Sachem Canonchet. In 1863, Sprague built a grand 64-room, four-story Victorian mansion on the property, which he named Canonchet after the Sachem. The mansion burned to the ground on October 11, 1909. The South County Museum opened on the Canonchet Farm grounds in 1985.

Second marriage
Following his divorce, William Sprague married Dora Inez Calvert (1859–1938) of West Virginia in Staunton, Virginia, in 1883.  He regained his interest in politics to become the first Narragansett, Rhode Island Town Council President in 1900. On October 11, 1909, a fire destroyed the Sprague mansion, including Sprague's diaries and other valuable artifacts. The Spragues moved to Paris.  During World War I, they opened their apartment as a convalescent hospital for the wounded of all nationalities.

Sprague died of complications from meningitis on September 11, 1915, a day short of his 85th birthday.  Following simple funeral services in France, his wife arranged for his body to be brought back to Rhode Island draped in an American flag.  He received full military honors when laid to rest in the family tomb at Swan Point Cemetery in Providence, Rhode Island. He was the last living senator who had served during the Civil War.

Notes

References
 from The History of Battery A, First Regiment Rhode Island Light Artillery. Aldrich, Thomas. Providence, Snow & Farham, Printers 1904.

Further reading

Dictionary of American Biography
Belden, Thomas Graham, and Marva Robins Belden. So Fell the Angels. Boston: Little, Brown Co., 1956.
Hoffman, Charles and Hoffman, Tess. Brotherly Love: Murder and the Politics of Prejudice in Nineteenth-Century Rhode Island. Amherst: The University of Massachusetts Press, 1993
Jordan, David M. Roscoe Conkling of New York: Voice in the Senate. Ithaca and London: Cornell University Press, c. 1971.
Knight, Benjamin. History of the Sprague Families, of Rhode Island. Santa Cruz: H. Coffin, 1881.
Lamphier, Peg A. Kate Chase and William Sprague: Politics and Gender in a Civil War Marriage. Lincoln: University of Nebraska Press, 2003.
Shoemaker, Henry Wharton. The Last of the War Governors: A Biographical Appreciation of Colonel William Sprague. Altoona, PA: Altoona Publishing Co., 1916
Sokoloff, Alice. Kate Chase for the Defense. New York: Dodd, Mead & Co., 1971.
William Sprague Papers Rhode Island Historical Society

External links

Death Certificate

1830 births
1915 deaths
Republican Party governors of Rhode Island
Politicians from Cranston, Rhode Island
People of Rhode Island in the American Civil War
Republican Party United States senators from Rhode Island
Union (American Civil War) state governors
Burials at Swan Point Cemetery
19th-century American politicians